Jabari Amin Greer (born February 11, 1982) is a former American football cornerback in the National Football League. He played college football at Tennessee and was signed by the Buffalo Bills as an undrafted free agent in 2004. Greer also played for the New Orleans Saints.

Early years
Born in Milwaukee, Wisconsin, Greer moved to Texas at age seven and later lived in Jackson, Tennessee, where he attended South Side High School. At South Side, Greer was an all-state selection in football and won seven individual state track championships.

College career
During his college career at Tennessee, Greer participated in track and field as well as football. He broke the 110m hurdles school record that had previously been held by Collin Henderson.  He was the 2003 NCAA Indoor Champion for 60 meter hurdles. Greer was a three-year starter at cornerback and broke a school record by playing in 51 games. He graduated from Tennessee in 2004 with a degree in psychology.

Professional career

Buffalo Bills
NFL Draft Scout predicted Greer to be a fourth or fifth round pick in the 2004 NFL Draft, but Greer was not selected. Greer's scouting report noted that he lacked size, a factor that might pose "problems in handling the larger receivers." The Buffalo Bills signed Greer on April 26, 2004 as an undrafted free agent. While in Buffalo he played mostly as a nickel or dimeback and on special teams. In 2008, he started the first 10 games of the season, recording two Pick 6s before suffering an injury.

New Orleans Saints
On March 4, 2009, Greer signed a four-year contract with the New Orleans Saints. He became a starter for the Saints and returned an interception for a touchdown in a game against the Atlanta Falcons. He was injured on November 8, 2009, and missed most of the rest of the 2009 regular season, but returned in time to play a significant role in the playoffs.

On February 12, 2014, three months after tearing his left ACL against the 49ers, Greer was cut by the New Orleans Saints to create more cap space for the team.

Retirement
On September 11, 2014, Greer announced his retirement during an appearance on ESPN.

Greer now works as an NFL Analyst for TSN in Canada, as well as a college football analyst for SEC Network.

Greer also was an on air broadcaster for Your Call Football, an interactive game where fans call real time plays for players, including former NFL players such as Greer.

Career statistics

Personal life
Greer became a single father after the passing of his wife, Katrina. He has established a non-profit foundation, the Greer Campaign, focused on programs to assist both single and married fathers in developing their parenting skills.

References

External links

1982 births
Living people
African-American players of American football
American football cornerbacks
Tennessee Volunteers football players
Buffalo Bills players
New Orleans Saints players
People from Jackson, Tennessee
Sportspeople from Milwaukee
Players of American football from Tennessee
Players of American football from Milwaukee
Track and field athletes from Milwaukee
College men's track and field athletes in the United States
21st-century African-American sportspeople
20th-century African-American people